James Rankin McNaught (8 June 1870 – March 1919) was a Scottish footballer who played as a half back.

Career
McNaught began his career with his local club, Dumbarton F.C.

After a brief spell in Northern Ireland with Linfield, he joined English club Newton Heath in February 1893. Upon signing, he was given a job as a boilermaker at the Lancashire and Yorkshire Railway depot at Newton Heath, and paid £4 per week during the season and £2 per week in summer. After signing, he made three friendly appearances as an inside right in March 1893, before suffering a dislocated elbow in the third game against Ardwick. He finally made his competitive debut for Newton Heath in the first game of the 1893–94 Football League season on 2 September 1893, starting at inside right in a 3–2 win over Burnley. He played as a forward for most of the season, but was moved into the half-backs for his last four appearances of 1893–94, becoming the club's regular centre-half for the next four years.

After scoring 12 goals in 162 games for Newton Heath, he left for Tottenham Hotspur in May 1898. His contract with Tottenham drew criticism from The Cricket & Football Field, which referred to his weekly wage of £4.10s (with a signing bonus of £50 up front) as "ridiculously high". Nevertheless, while there, he helped Tottenham win the 1899–1900 Southern Football League. Towards the end of his nine-year spell with the London side, he joined their coaching staff, before moving to Maidstone United in 1907. He retired from football in 1909, but died 10 years later.

Honours
Dumbarton
 Scottish League: 1890–91, 1891–92
 Dumbartonshire Cup: 1890–91, 1891–92, 1892–93
 League Charity Cup: 1890–91

References
General

Specific

External links
Profile at StretfordEnd.co.uk

1870 births
1919 deaths
Sportspeople from Dumbarton
Footballers from West Dunbartonshire
Scottish footballers
Dumbarton F.C. players
Linfield F.C. players
Manchester United F.C. players
Tottenham Hotspur F.C. players
Maidstone United F.C. (1897) players
Association football midfielders
Scottish Football League players
English Football League players
NIFL Premiership players
Southern Football League players